Martyn Sanderson  (24 February 1938 – 14 October 2009) was a New Zealand actor, director, producer, writer and poet. 

Sanderson was described as one of the founding fathers of modern theatre in New Zealand. In New Zealand he had appearances in 26 films, but also worked internationally including in Australia and Samoa.

Biography 

Sanderson was born the son of a missionary father and a mother who was a writer, he studied literature at Oxford University, and after a brief study of theology, he abandoned his initial plans of joining the priesthood and a married a ceramic artist, Liz Earth. 

After returning to his native NZ, he was one of the founders of Downstage Theatre (now the Hannah Playhouse) in 1964 in Wellington, with a vision of a small professional company performing challenging works in an intimate venue, it is now one of the longest serving theatre companies in New Zealand. He emigrated to Australia in 1966, where he started producing his own documentaries and acting in film roles including the British-Australia production of Ned Kelly. In 1972, his family relocated to Hawkes Bay, where Sanderson toured with the multi-media group Blerta, and worked on films with Blerta members Bruno Lawrence and director Geoff Murphy. That decade he won a New Zealand Feltex Award for playing aviator Richard Pearse in a television film of the same title, and was nominated again for playing a British general in the historical miniseries The Governor, the most expensive TV drama made in New Zealand in that decade.

Sanderson's work as a screen director included a number of shorts featuring New Zealand poets, plus the 1989 feature Flying Fox in a Freedom Tree. Based on a work by Albert Wendt, Flying Fox is about a young Samoan caught between the values of his homeland and European colonisers.

He wrote a documentary One of those Blighters on Ronald Hugh Morrieson and the screenplay for the 1986 film of Morrieson's last novel, Pallet on the Floor.

Sanderson's other screen credits include Geoff Murphy's Utu, Jane Campion's An Angel at my Table, The Scarecrow, Old Scores, The Harp in the South, The Lord of the Rings film trilogy, a recurring guest role in the first two years of Shortland Street, Poor Man's Orange, the Hercules episode "The King of Thieves" and The Rainbow Warrior. At the time of his death he was working on a play called Muntu with his second wife, Wanjiku Kiare Sanderson and directed by Kenyen artist and playwright Wakanyote Njuguna, through the African Connection Aotearoa, that they also founded. Sanderson died of emphysema on 14 October 2009.

Honours

Sanderson was made an Officer of the New Zealand Order of Merit in 2005, "for services to literature and the theatre".

Selected filmography

References

External links

1938 births
2009 deaths
Officers of the New Zealand Order of Merit
New Zealand male television actors
New Zealand male film actors
New Zealand screenwriters
Male screenwriters
New Zealand male soap opera actors
20th-century New Zealand male actors
21st-century New Zealand male actors
20th-century screenwriters